Whiteface River may refer to a waterway in the United States:

Whiteface River (Minnesota)
Whiteface River (New Hampshire)